Bugulminsky Uyezd (Бугульминский уезд) was one of the subdivisions of the Samara Governorate of the Russian Empire. It was situated in the northeastern part of the governorate. Its administrative centre was Bugulma.

Demographics
At the time of the Russian Empire Census of 1897, Bugulminsky Uyezd had a population of 299,884. Of these, 35.8% spoke Tatar, 31.7% Russian, 12.5% Mordvin, 9.9% Bashkir, 8.5% Chuvash, 0.7% Udmurt, 0.6% Turkmen and 0.2% Ukrainian as their native language.

References

 
Uezds of Samara Governorate
Samara Governorate